Theeram Thedunna Thira is a 1983 Indian Malayalam-language film directed by A. Vincent and produced by Boban Kunchacko. The film stars Prem Nazir, Ambika, Mammootty, Ratheesh and Raveendran. The film has musical score by Shyam.

Cast
 
Prem Nazir as Sudhakaran
Ambika as Jayalakshmi
Mammootty as Madhu
Ratheesh as Jayadevan
KPAC Lalitha as Madhavi
Raveendran as Suresh
Silk Smitha as Smitha
Sukumari as Jayalakshmi's mother
T. G. Ravi as Balakrishnan
P. K. Abraham as Govidan master
Jagathy Sreekumar as Thampi
Prathapachandran as Justice Prabhakaran 
Santhakumari as Sudhakaran's mother
Mala Aravindan as Sekhara Pilla
Alummoodan as Kumaran
Nithya Ravindran as Nurse 
Jayasree Krishna as Usha

Soundtrack
The music was composed by Shyam and the lyrics were written by Balaraman and P. Bhaskaran.

References

External links
 

1982 films
1980s Malayalam-language films
Films directed by A. Vincent